Robert Berks (April 26, 1922 – May 16, 2011) was an American sculptor, industrial designer and planner. He created hundreds of bronze sculptures and monuments including the Mary McLeod Bethune Memorial, and the Albert Einstein Memorial in Washington, D.C.

Life
He grew up in Hecht House, Boston. He studied at the Boston Museum.
In 1953, he married Dorothy “Tod” Berks.

One of Berks's most famous works is a bust of former President John Fitzgerald Kennedy that can be found in the Grand Foyer of The John F. Kennedy Center for the Performing Arts in Washington, DC.

A copy of his Bust of Abraham Lincoln was displayed in the Oval Office during the Clinton Administration.
Another of his statues, that of the Swedish botanist and physician Carl Linnaeus, can be found in the Heritage Garden of the Chicago Botanic Garden in Glencoe, Illinois.
In 2005, he donated a sculpture of Einstein to Princeton University.
In 2007, he made a sculpture of Fred Rogers for Pittsburgh.

He died on May 16, 2011, at the age of 89 from natural causes.

Public monuments

 Louis Dembitz Brandeis Sculpture, Brandeis University, Waltham, Massachusetts, 1956
 Abraham Lincoln Bust, 1958
 Richard Caliguiri Memorial, Pittsburgh City-County Building Pittsburgh, Pennsylvania
 Robert F. Kennedy bust, Smithsonian Institute, 1968
 Robert F. Kennedy Memorial, Department of Justice Washington, DC, 1969
 Mary McLeod Bethune Memorial, Lincoln Park, Washington, DC, 1974
 Albert Einstein Memorial, National Academy of Sciences, Washington, DC, 1979
 John F. Kennedy Bust, Kennedy Center Washington, DC, 1971
 Carl Linnaeus Monument, Chicago Botanic Garden, Glencoe, Illinois, 1983
 Reinhold Niebuhr Memorial, Elmhurst College, 1997
 Albert Einstein statue, Borough Hall Walk, Princeton, NJ, 2005
 Fred Rogers Memorial, Pittsburgh, Pennsylvania, 2009

References

Sources
 James M. Goode: Outdoor Sculpture of Washington D.C. Smithsonian Institution Press, 1979,

External links

 Photos of Mary McLeod Bethune Memorial
 Photos of Albert Einstein Memorial
 Biographies in bronze - Robert Berks Studios
 Robert Berks: Albert Einstein

1922 births
2011 deaths
Artists from Boston
Sculptors from Massachusetts
20th-century American sculptors
20th-century American male artists
21st-century American sculptors
21st-century American male artists
American male sculptors